Mussurana can refer to the following snake genera:

 Mussurana
 Clelia
 Boiruna

Snake common names